The 2012 Clemson Tigers football team represented Clemson University in the 2012 NCAA Division I FBS football season. The Tigers were led by head coach Dabo Swinney in his fourth full year and fifth overall since taking over midway through 2008 season. They played their home games at Memorial Stadium, also known as "Death Valley". They were members of the Atlantic Division of the Atlantic Coast Conference. On November 10, Clemson set a school record with their 12th straight home win at Death Valley. They finished the season 11–2, 7–1 in ACC play to be Atlantic Division co–champions with Florida State. Due to their loss to Florida State, they did not represent the division the ACC Championship Game. They were invited to the Chick-fil-A Bowl where they defeated LSU. The Tigers had their first 11-win season since 1981.

Personnel

Coaching staff

Schedule

Depth chart

Recruiting class

Game summaries

Auburn

Ball State

Furman

Florida State

Boston College

Georgia Tech

Virginia Tech

Wake Forest

Duke

Maryland

NC State

South Carolina

LSU (Chick-Fil-A Bowl)

Rankings

2013 NFL draft
Clemson had four players selected in the 2013 NFL draft.  DeAndre Hopkins went in the first round as the 27th overall pick.

References

External links
 2012 Clemson Tigers at ESPN

Clemson
Clemson Tigers football seasons
Peach Bowl champion seasons
Clemson Tigers football